Lars Børgesen (born 6 March 1954) is a Danish former backstroke swimmer. He competed in two events at the 1972 Summer Olympics.

References

External links
 

1954 births
Living people
Danish male backstroke swimmers
Olympic swimmers of Denmark
Swimmers at the 1972 Summer Olympics
Sportspeople from Aarhus